Guido Alberti (20 April 1909 – 3 August 1996) was an Italian film actor. He appeared in 60 films between 1963 and 1993.

Selected filmography

 Wild Love (1956) - Sor Alberto (uncredited)
 8½ (1963) - Pace, il produttore
 The Executioner (1963) - Director de la prisión
 Hands Over the City (1963) - Maglione
 Aimez-vous les femmes ? (1964) - Mr. Khouroulis
 Le Grain de sable (1964) - Rudolf Kubler
 Angélique, Marquise des Anges (1964) - Le grand Mathieu (uncredited)
 Marvelous Angelique (1965) - Le grand Mathieu (uncredited)
 La fuga (1965) - Il padre di Piera
 Su e giù (1965) - Il commendatore Persici (segment "Colpo da leoni, Il")
 The Camp Followers (1965) - Gambardelli
 Casanova 70 (1965) - Il monsignore
 Marco the Magnificent (1965) - Pope Gregory X
 The Dreamer (1965) - Uncle Marco
 Juliet of the Spirits (1965) - Player (uncredited)
 Shoot Loud, Louder... I Don't Understand (1966) - Pasquale Cimmaruta
 Un choix d'assassins (1967) - Domenico
 OSS 117 - Double Agent (1968) - Faruk Melik - il braccio destro del Maggiore
 The Vatican Affair (1968) - Il cardinale Masoli - il sovrintentdente del tesoro vativano
 A Fine Pair (1968) - Uncle Camillo Marini
 La prova generale (1968)
 Giovinezza, giovinezza (1969) - Avv. Milazzo
 Le regine (1970)
 La califfa (1970) - Il monsignore
 The Decameron (1971) - Musciatto, wealthy merchant
 The Fifth Cord (1971) - Traversi
 Ten Days' Wonder (1971) - Ludovic Van Horn - le frère et régisseur de Théo
 What? (1972) - Priest
 Sans sommation (1973) - (uncredited)
 La ragazza fuoristrada (1973) - Monsignor Vittorio Baudana
 Tony Arzenta (1973) - Don Mariano
 Deux hommes dans la ville (1973) - The owner of the printing shop
 The Bloody Hands of the Law (1973) - Prof. Palmieri
 Spasmo (1974) - Malcolm
 Violins at the Ball (1974) - Le producteur italien
 Silence the Witness (1974) - Il questore
 Almost Human (1974) - Mr. Porrino - Marilù's father
 La sensualità è... un attimo di vita (1975)
 Syndicate Sadists (1975) - Owner of Billiard Salon
 Hallucination Strip (1975) - Il capo della polizia
 Napoli violenta (1976) - Superintendent
 The Black Corsair (1976) - Governor of Ribeira
 The Cynic, the Rat and the Fist (1977) - Uncle
 Bobby Deerfield (1977) - Priest In The Garden
 L'Affaire Suisse (1978) - Anione
 Contraband (1980) - Don Morrone
 The Mafia Triangle (1981) - Chief of Police
 La guérilléra (1982) - Joao Bernardo
 Moon in the Gutter (1983) - Le gardien de la cathédrale
 A Strange Passion (1984) - Valerio - l'ami de Piacchi
 Saving Grace (1986) - Cardinal Augusto Morante
 Love and Fear (1988) - Baretti
 Alcune signore per bene (1990) - Tarlazzi
 The Yes Man (1991) - Carlo Sperati
 Donne in un giorno di festa (1993) - Nonno Anselmo

References

External links

1909 births
1996 deaths
People from Benevento
Italian male film actors
20th-century Italian male actors